The LG VX8500 (or "Chocolate") was a slider cellphone-MP3 player hybrid that was sold as a feature phone by LG. It was released in July 2006 for online sale in the U.S. through the network Verizon Wireless. On August 7, 2006, it was released for sale in Verizon stores. In addition to the original black “Dark Chocolate” model, the LG Chocolate VX8500 was also available in light green, white, pink, and red models called "Mint Chocolate," "White Chocolate," "Strawberry Chocolate," and "Cherry Chocolate," respectively.

The LG Chocolate which was introduced by LG in 2006 was the most popular phone in the company’s history. The Chocolate VX8500 phone managed to sell over 21 million handsets worldwide.

The LG Chocolate had successor called the VX8550 LG Chocolate "Spin" which featured touch buttons with improved accuracy, a scroll wheel, support for 4 GB microSD cards, and tactile send and end keys.

Origin

The original LG Chocolate(KV5900) was released in Korea long before the UK or U.S. version. In Britain, it was available in three colors: black, blue, and yellow. After becoming an extremely popular item in the UK, the model was released in the United States and Canada.

The US Chocolate is a different model (VX8500), with a QVGA (320x240) LCD over the KG800's 176x220 LCD. The touch panel on the VX8500 has a slightly different design, with a circular button arrangement bordered with glossy metal, versus the KG800's square arrangement featuring simple arrow designs (a defining part of the ads for the original LG Chocolate ), and a rounded silver rectangle bordering the "OK" button in the center. The A2DP and AVRCP Bluetooth profiles are available on the VX8500, but not on the KG800. Unlike  the VX8500, the KG800's number pad  features a matte grey/glossy black checkerboard pattern and the camera has a white LED flash.

Ad campaign
The in-store release of the VX8500/Chocolate followed six television commercials created by future-UK Marketer of the Year John Bernard, four of which featured music playing while the device was displayed from various camera angles, often with the glow from the touch-panel leaving a trail. The device was shown closed, making it look like an MP3 player, and the commercials ended with the music pausing, the phone opening, and a phone call or message being played. 

In one campaign the song "Candyman" by Christina Aguilera is featured. Another featured "Love Me or Hate Me" by Lady Sovereign. The fifth commercial simply played Goldfrapp's "Strict Machine" while the phone emerged from liquid chocolate. The sixth commercial showed cherries being squished into a paste to make a reddish phone, a chocolate dipped into a pool of white chocolate, and mint being chopped to make a green phone, also to the song Candyman.  Verizon also scented select units to tie the phone into the ad campaign.

Features

Specifications

Touch panel
The face of the Chocolate has no tactile buttons, but rather touch-sensitive panels with red-orange illuminating symbols to designate the touch-sensitive areas.

The buttons include four corner buttons (Left option, right option, Call, and Return), and a wheel. The four sides of the wheel behave like a direction pad in most applications. In the music player, they work as scroll up/down, and next/previous track. The OK button in the center of the wheel doubles as Pause/Play in the music player.

See also
 LG Chocolate (KG800)
 LG Prada (KE850)
 LG Chocolate (VX8550)
 LG Chocolate (VX8575)

References

External links
 Chocolate review - PCWorld.ca
 V Cast Music Essentials Manager - Official music sync software from Verizon.

Sources 
 LG Electronics USA - Mobile Phones
 LG Electronics Canada - Mobile Phones (English)
 Telephone Cellulaire LG : Telephonie mobile - LG Canada site officiel (Français)
 Verizon Wireless
 
 
 
 
 
 
 

VX8500
Mobile phones introduced in 2006